Wesly Roberto Decas (born 11 August 1999) is a Honduran professional footballer who plays as a defender for Motagua.

Club career

Motagua Reserves, Atletico Independiente, and club trials
Decas started his career by signing with F.C. Motagua. He played for the reserve team until he was signed by Atlético Independiente. Impressing internationally with the U-20's at the 2017 CONCACAF U-20 Championship and the 2017 FIFA U-20 World Cup, he was offered trials with English Premier League team Liverpool F.C. and Dutch Eredivisie team PSV Eindhoven.

FC Juárez
On 29 August 2017, Decas signed with Mexican team FC Juárez in the Ascenso MX on a season long loan. He made his debut on 10 January 2018 in a 3–1 win against Lobos BUAP in the Copa MX.

C.D. Nacional
On 22 July 2018, Portuguese Primeira Liga team C.D. Nacional announced the signing of Decas on a two–year loan. Decas made his debut in a 2–1 against Vitória Setúbal on 26 August 2018. He played alongside fellow countryman Bryan Róchez and was even invited by Róchez to meet his family. On 24 January 2019, Decas terminated his contract with Nacional saying, "I left because I wasn't playing and that affected me."

Atlanta United 2
On 15 February 2019, Atlanta United 2 announced the loan signing of Decas for the 2019 season, with an option to buy. He made his debut coming on as a substitute for Florentin Pogba in a 2–0 away loss to Saint Louis FC.

References

External links
 Wesly Decas F.C. Motagua official profile 
 
 
 

1999 births
Living people
Association football defenders
Honduran footballers
Honduras international footballers
Honduran expatriate footballers
Primeira Liga players
C.D. Nacional players
F.C. Motagua players
Liga Nacional de Fútbol Profesional de Honduras players
Expatriate footballers in Mexico
Expatriate footballers in Portugal
Expatriate soccer players in the United States
Honduran expatriate sportspeople in Mexico
Honduran expatriate sportspeople in Portugal
Honduran expatriate sportspeople in the United States
FC Juárez footballers
Ascenso MX players
Atlanta United 2 players
Central American Games gold medalists for Honduras
Central American Games medalists in football
People from Cortés Department
Honduras under-20 international footballers
Footballers at the 2020 Summer Olympics
Olympic footballers of Honduras